Salvatore Maresca (born 16 September 1993) is an Italian artistic gymnast. He is the 2021 World Artistic Gymnastics Championships bronze medalist in still rings and the 2021 European Championships bronze medalist in the rings. The former award he shared in a tie with Russian gymnast Grigorii Klimentev. Additionally, he received the gold medal in still rings at the 2021 FIG Artistic Gymnastics World Cup series event in Osijek. He was given the nickname "Thor" by Ginnastica Salerno club president Antonello Di Cerbo because of his strength on rings.

Competitive history

References 

Living people
1993 births
Italian male artistic gymnasts
Sportspeople from Naples
Medalists at the World Artistic Gymnastics Championships